Sant may refer to:

People 
 Alfred Sant (born 1948), Maltese politician
 Andrew Sant (born 1950), English-born Australian poet
 David Sant (born 1968), Catalan director, actor and writer
 Indira Sant (1914–2000), Indian poet
 James Sant (1820–1916), British painter
 Lorry Sant (1937–1995), Maltese politician

Places 
 Sant State, a former princely salute state in Rewa Kantha, Gujarat, India
 Sant, Övörkhangai, a district in Mongolia
 Sant, Selenge, a district in Mongolia
 Șanț, a commune in Bistriţa-Năsăud County, Romania
 Șanț River, a tributary of the Trotuş River in Romania

Religion 
 Sant (religion), in Hinduism, Jainism, and Buddhism, an enlightened human being, commonly translated as "Saint"
 Sant Joan (disambiguation)

Other 
 Sant tree (Acacia nilotica), a tree species found in Africa
 Teniente General Benjamín Matienzo International Airport, Argentina (ICAO code: SANT)

See also 
 Sants (disambiguation)
 Dewi Sant (disambiguation)
 Van Sant (disambiguation)